Mićanović is a Serbian surname. Notable people with the surname include:

Dragan Mićanović (born 1970), Serbian actor
Mladen Mićanović (born 1996), Serbian footballer

See also
Milanović

Serbian surnames